Syed Adnan Faruque (born October 24, 1979), also known as Hillol, is a Bangladeshi model, actor, presenter and YouTuber. He made his film debut in Chorabali in 2012. He has starred in several drama serials including Mukhosh Manush, Highway, Three Comrades, Terminal and No Problem. His YouTube channels focuses on food and travel vlogs.

Early life 
Faruque was born on October 24, 1979 in Sylhet, Bangladesh. His father later moved to Khulna with family for government service. His theater life began in 1995 through "Desh Natok".

Career

He played in theater early in his career. He began his acting career by appearing in Chorabali. Later he starred in another film called Hello Amit.

Works

Films

Dramas

References

External links
 

1977 births
Bangladeshi male television actors
Bangladeshi film actors
Living people
Bangladeshi YouTubers
People from Sylhet